Ward is a small town in Marlborough, New Zealand. The Flaxbourne River flows past to the north and into the Pacific Ocean at Ward Beach to the south-east of Ward. A current initiative aims to have the town renamed as Flaxbourne.

History

Flaxbourne Station was established in the area around 1847. In 1905, most of the station was subdivided as part of the government's land reform, and Ward township was formed. The area was known by the name of the station. On the initiative of Richard Seddon, who was prime minister at the time, the township was named after his friend and political colleague Joseph Ward; a measure that was controversial at the time.

In 1961 the population was 218.

As of 2017, there is a campaign to have the town renamed as Flaxbourne. The NZ Geographic Board, i.e. the organisation that has the final say on place names in New Zealand, has advised that the name Ward has never been officially registered.

Demographics 
It is part of the wider Awatere statistical area.

Ward had a population of 81 at the 2018 New Zealand census, a decrease of 27 people (-25.0%) since the 2013 census, and a decrease of 21 people (-20.6%) since the 2006 census. There were 36 households. There were 45 males and 33 females, giving a sex ratio of 1.36 males per female. The median age was 51 years (compared with 37.4 years nationally), with 12 people (14.8%) aged under 15 years, 6 (7.4%) aged 15 to 29, 42 (51.9%) aged 30 to 64, and 21 (25.9%) aged 65 or older.

Ethnicities were 88.9% European/Pākehā, 22.2% Māori, and 3.7% other ethnicities (totals add to more than 100% since people could identify with multiple ethnicities).

Although some people objected to giving their religion, 59.3% had no religion and 40.7% were Christian.

Of those at least 15 years old, 6 (8.7%) people had a bachelor or higher degree, and 15 (21.7%) people had no formal qualifications. The median income was $29,100, compared with $31,800 nationally. The employment status of those at least 15 was that 42 (60.9%) people were employed full-time, 12 (17.4%) were part-time, and 0 (0.0%) were unemployed.

Education
A celebration to mark 100 years of schooling in the area was held in 2006.

References

External links 
 
 

Populated places in the Marlborough Region